The Clock Tower of Kavajë is a monument of cultural heritage located in Kavajë, Albania. Initially it was designated as such by the Institute of Sciences with decision no. 95, dated 16 October 1948, later by the rectorate of the State University of Tirana with decision no. 6, dated 15 January 1963 and finally by the Ministry of Education and Culture with reference no. 1886, dated 10 June 1973.

History
The precise date and history of its construction is explained inside a chronogram located on the western side of the clock tower. The Ottoman text translated into Albanian by orientalist Vexhi Buharaja reads as follows:

The descriptive language may seem somewhat unintelligible today, but surely there would have been a meaning of significance behind it.

Above the inscription is found the word Barakallah, used to express thanks, whereas the word Mashallah, which expresses a feeling of awe or beauty, is located on the southern end. 
Additionally, a fourth inscription is located in the bell of the clock tower, which reads:

The clock tower, attributed to local ruler Ibrahim bey Alltuni, was designed and built in form and content for measuring the time with a sound mechanism. The local traders that had frequent contacts and commercial ties with several European cities, brought from there a clock mechanism which at first lacked a face for setting the hands (pointers) of the clock and functioned mainly as a measuring clock with sound. 

The walling of the three arched windows as well as the installation of the sundial (if we were to call it so) on the west face of the tower, are thought to have been added at a later time (before 12 October 1848, as depicted in Edward Lear's drawing).

By means of the sundial, in every season of the year, at noon, when the sun's rays entered the central pit of the circular white stone, the clock tower served as a signal for closing shops, for a lunch break or the daily afternoon prayer.
 
A differing theory explains how the circular white stone is not a sundial, but an element where the sun's rays enter directly into the  hole and the clockkeeper in this instance made adjustments to the clock, since the movement of the sun's rays was static for twelve minutes. This time correction was performed every six months, sequentially on March 21 and September 23, both dates that coincide with the spring and autumn equinoxes, when days and nights are equal by twelve hours.

Architecture
The foundation rests on a slightly sloped rocky ground.

The structure is built of stonemasonry with lime mortar and visible wooden bands in its interior. On the outside, at certain heights between the gray stones, the stonemason has used a row of well-hewn white limestone. The corners are worked with hewn stones. The sticking material of the masonry was lime mortar, while its outer side has a  gap between the stones with a special mixture used called "khorasan mortar", which does not allow for the penetration of rainwater.

The earthquake of 17 December 1926 may have caused damage to the southeast corner of the wall, after which the restorative intervention that was carried out with the deliberate use of white stone by the master restorer, made the restoration distinct.

Another phase where the intervention can be noticed is the walling of the three arched windows prior to 1848 and in the frontal view from the bazaar, in one of these walled spaces, a sundial was placed which still exists today.

The change in mechanism from measuring the time solely with sound to having a clock face and sound, brought changes to the original appearance of the clock tower's upper facade at the end of the 1930s.

In 2018, a restorative intervention project by experts from the Institute of Monuments of Culture was funded by the Turkish Cooperation and Coordination Agency (TIKA).

References

Tirana
Cultural Monuments of Albania
Towers completed in 1818
 1817